Dor Elo (born 26 September 1993) is an Israeli footballer who currently plays for Hapoel Tel Aviv.

Honours

Club
Hapoel Be'er Sheva
Israel Super Cup (1): 2017

Notes

1993 births
Israeli Jews
Living people
Israeli footballers
Maccabi Petah Tikva F.C. players
Hapoel Be'er Sheva F.C. players
Bnei Yehuda Tel Aviv F.C. players
Hapoel Ironi Kiryat Shmona F.C. players
Hapoel Tel Aviv F.C. players
Israeli Premier League players
Liga Leumit players
Footballers from Petah Tikva
Association football defenders
Israeli people of Syrian-Jewish descent
Israeli people of Greek-Jewish descent
Israeli people of Iraqi-Jewish descent